Tamara Smbatian (born 19 March 1995) is a Ukrainian handball player who plays for the Ukrainian national team.

Achievements 
Ukrainian Super League:
Winner: 2015
Ekstraklasa:
Bronze Medalist: 2018, 2019
EHF Challenge Cup:
Semifinalist: 2015

Individual awards 
 Ukrainian Super League MVP: 2014
 European Universities Championships MVP: 2013

References

 
 

1995 births
Living people
Ukrainian female handball players
Sportspeople from Ivano-Frankivsk
Expatriate handball players
Ukrainian expatriate sportspeople in Poland 
Ukrainian expatriate sportspeople in Romania
Ukrainian expatriate sportspeople in Hungary